William Ole Ntimama Stadium, formerly called Narok Stadium, is a 20,000 seat association football and multi-use stadium in Narok. It is currently the home field of Kariobangi Sharks F.C. and Sofapaka F.C. of the Kenyan Premier League, the top-flight of Kenyan football.

The Office of the Deputy Prime Minister of Kenya commissioned a renovation of the stadium in 2012 following a request by the local government.  The stadium was renamed in 2020 after late politician William Ole Ntimama who died in 2016.

Kenyan stadiums 

The William Ole Ntimama Stadium is the second largest stadium by capacity in Kenya.

References

Multi-purpose stadiums in Kenya
Football venues in Kenya
Sports venues in Kenya
Sport in Nairobi
Buildings and structures in Nairobi